Fay was a small settlement in Paradise Township, Russell County, Kansas, United States.

History
Fay was issued a post office in 1883. The post office was discontinued in 1908.

References

Former populated places in Russell County, Kansas
Former populated places in Kansas